Votikeyevo is a rural locality (a selo) in Ufa, Bashkortostan, Russia. The population was 286 as of 2010. There are 4 streets.

Geography 
Votikeyevo is located 32 km northeast of Ufa. Cherkassy is the nearest rural locality.

References 

Rural localities in Ufa urban okrug